James W. Whittaker (born February 10, 1929), also known as Jim Whittaker, is an American mountaineer and mountain guide. Born and raised in Seattle, Washington, on May 1, 1963 he became the first American to reach the summit of Mount Everest as a member of the American Mount Everest Expedition led by Norman Dyhrenfurth, alongside the Sherpa Nawang Gombu (a nephew of Tenzing Norgay).  They ran out of oxygen, but managed to reach the summit.

Biography
He is the twin brother of Lou Whittaker, a mountain guide who is often mistakenly credited with achieving the 1963 ascent of Everest. The twins started climbing in their teens in the 1940s while in the Boy Scouts.

Whittaker graduated from West Seattle High School and Seattle University.

On July 25, 1955, Whittaker became the first full-time employee of Recreational Equipment Inc. and was the company's CEO in the 1960s as well as an early board member with American Alpine Club president Nicholas Clinch. When Whittaker climbed Mount Everest, it provided REI with so much free advertising that the following year, 1964, its gross income topped US$1 million for the first time.

In 1965, with Dee Molenaar and others, he guided Robert F. Kennedy up the newly named Mount Kennedy. Kennedy and Whittaker became fast friends and spent multiple vacations together. In 1968, he became Kennedy’s state campaign chairman. When Kennedy was shot in Los Angeles, Whittaker immediately flew over to comfort RFK's wife when her brother in law had to shut off life-support.

In 1990, he led the Earth Day 20 International Peace Climb that brought together climbers from the United States, USSR, and China to summit Mount Everest. In addition to putting twenty climbers on the summit, the expedition hauled off a large amount of trash left on the mountain by previous expeditions.

Currently, Whittaker is chairman of the Board of Magellan Navigation, a company that produces handheld global positioning system (GPS) units.

In 1999 Whittaker released his autobiography, A Life on the Edge: Memoirs of Everest and Beyond. His younger son, Leif Whittaker, published My Old Man and the Mountain: A Memoir in 2016, which relates the story of his own summit of Mount Everest, with his parents accompanying him on part of the journey, and with comparisons to his father's Mount Everest experiences.

Whittaker and his wife, Dianne Roberts, live in Port Townsend, Washington. Their children are Joss and Leif Whittaker.

Awards and honors 
 For being the first American to scale Mount Everest, Whittaker was awarded the Hubbard Medal by United States President John F. Kennedy.
 Big Jim Mountain in Chelan County, Washington is named for him.

See also
List of 20th-century summiters of Mount Everest

References

External links
Jim Whittaker: A Life on the Edge, Mountain Culture at The Banff Centre, March 21, 2002
 Interview with Jim Whittaker (2007)
 Sarah Holbrooke interviews Jim Whittaker by Mountainfilm in Telluride
 

1929 births
Alpine guides
Living people
American mountain climbers
Mountain climbers from Seattle
American twins
Seattle University alumni
American summiters of Mount Everest
Twin sportspeople
People from Port Townsend, Washington
West Seattle High School alumni